Bodduluri Rama Rao, is a former member of legislature of Andhra Pradesh and he is also a Telugu film producer.

Early life 
Bodduluri Ramarao belongs to the RamiReddypally village in the Krishna district. He is a well known personality of the Kamma community. He served as member of Andhra Pradesh Legislature for Jaggayyapet constituency during the period 1978. Bodduluri has a son, Venkateswararao Bodduluri, who is also an active politician in the Telugu Desam Party.

Career

Politics
Bodduluri was elected for the sixth Andhra Pradesh Legislature constituted on 3 May 1978 from Jaggayyapet constituency and remained inactive for a few years. Later in January 2009 he filed nominations for MLC but withdrew after the strategy meeting conducted in district headquarters. Bodduluri is strong supporter of Telangana movement and also a strong supporter of the Jai Andhra Movement. Bodduluri has actively organized protests seeking separate Andhra in various parts of Andhra Pradesh.

Films
In 2007, he produced a film Mr. Medhavi with his grandson Gopichand Lagadapati under Life Style Art Pictures. The film was directed by G. Neelakanta Reddy and it features Raja Abel, Genelia D'Souza and Sonu Sood.

Other works
Bodduluri is the President of Andhra Pradesh temple union employees and have fought for the implementation of G.O 65(A) as per date 26 July 2010. He is also a member of Central Board of Film Certification of Andhra Pradesh.

References

External links 

Telugu film producers
Members of the Andhra Pradesh Legislative Assembly
Living people
Telugu politicians
People from Krishna district
Film producers from Andhra Pradesh
Year of birth missing (living people)